The Keats-Shelley Prize was inaugurated in 1998 by the Keats-Shelley Memorial Association. Its purpose is to encourage people of all ages to respond personally to the emotions aroused in them by the work of the Romantics, through rising to the challenge of writing their own poem or essay. 
Distinguished judges of the Prize have included Andrew Motion, Claire Tomalin, Tom Paulin, Grevel Lindop, Miranda Seymour, the late Lord Gilmour, James Fenton, Stephen Fry, Jonathan Keates, A.N.Wilson, Ann Wroe, Janet Todd, Jack Mapanje, Dame Penelope Lively, Colin Thubron and Salley Vickers.

References

External links

Poetry awards
Awards established in 1998